Wallace Duffy (born 12 April 1999) is a Scottish professional footballer who plays for Inverness Caledonian Thistle as a right-back or a centre-back.

Club career
Duffy began his career with Rangers, before playing for Celtic, making one appearance for their under-20s team in the Scottish Challenge Cup. He signed for St Johnstone in June 2019, and stated his intention to break into the first-team.

In September 2020, St Johnstone agreed to loan Duffy to Greenock Morton for the 2020/21 season, but days later this deal was cancelled due to "non-footballing reasons". He was released by St Johnstone in October 2020. Later that month he signed for Inverness Caledonian Thistle.

International career
Duffy has represented Scotland at under-17 and under-19 youth levels.

References

1999 births
Living people
Scottish footballers
Rangers F.C. players
Celtic F.C. players
St Johnstone F.C. players
Greenock Morton F.C. players
Inverness Caledonian Thistle F.C. players
Association football fullbacks
Scotland youth international footballers
Scottish Professional Football League players
Place of birth missing (living people)